Bikash Yumnam (born 6 September 2003) is an Indian professional footballer who plays as a defender for Indian Super League club Chennaiyin. Yumnam was included in The Guardian's 2020 edition of their list of 60 footballers for the next generation, on 7 October 2020.

Club career

He made his I-League professional debut for Indian Arrows on 5 February 2020, at Tilak Maidan against NEROCA FC, he started and played full match as they drew 0–0.

On 16 January 2023, Yumnam joined Indian Super League side Chennaiyin on a permanent deal.

International career
Bikash was part of the Indian U-16 team that reached the quarterfinals of the 2018 AFC U-16 Championship in Malaysia.

Career statistics

Club

Honours

International 
SAFF U-15 Championship: 2017
SAFF U-20 Championship: 2022

References

2003 births
Living people
People from Manipur
Indian footballers
Indian Arrows players
I-League players
Footballers from Manipur
India youth international footballers
Association football defenders
RoundGlass Punjab FC players